Alywn Bramley-Moore (July 3, 1878 – April 4, 1916) was a provincial politician, author and soldier from Alberta, Canada. He served as a member of the Legislative Assembly of Alberta from 1909 to 1913 sitting with the Liberal caucus in government. After his political career he served in the Canadian Expeditionary Force in World War I from 1914 to his death in 1916.

Early life
He homesteaded a farm near Lloydminster moving to Edmonton in 1910.

He met and married Ellen Nellie Grieve (1877-1950). They had two daughters and one son William (later a prominent Edmonton doctor). (William Bramley-Moore (1906-1976) is the namesake of an Edmonton park.)

Political career
Bramley-Moore ran for a seat to the Legislative Assembly of Alberta in the 1909 Alberta general election as the Liberal candidate in the electoral district of Alexandra. He defeated the other candidate, future MLA James Lowery, in a landslide victory, taking 65 percent of the vote. He served only a single term in the provincial legislature, sitting in the back benches on the Government (Liberal) side of the Legislative Assembly.

In 1911, he wrote Canada and Her Colonies, or Home Rule for Alberta. This book sets forth a claim for the end of the protective tariff that is "designed to build up Canadian industries," mostly located in central Canada.  He also called on the federal government to grant Alberta control of its natural resources and Crown lands (finally achieved in 1929). He described Alberta as a colony of the Phoenician type (that is, settled by emigrants of he home country) and not a colony of the Roman type (a conquered people). He states that just as in 1911 the Irish were accorded by many the right to Home Rule so should Alberta's right be recognized.

He though did not call for secession of the West (the territory west of a line drawn from Port Arthur (Thunder Bay) to the Hudsons Bay). He wrote "We are not urging the secession of the West from the East but we are endeavouring to show that such a result must ensue unless a change in her system of colonial government is made by Canada." He feared for the result if reforms were not made, saying "The laws of evolution are inexorable, and resistance will only result in a catastrophe." The 1911 Canadian election produced a win for the Conservatives who were strongly in support of Protectionism.

He retired from elected office at dissolution of the Assembly in 1913 and did not run for re-election

Late life
After Bramley-Moore retired from provincial politics, he served on the Alberta Commission of the American Commission for the Study of Agricultural Credit. He and Henry Marshal Tory, president of the UofA, co-wrote a report on rural credit reform (to address the need for low-interest farm loans).

After the outbreak of World War I, he volunteered to join the army. He died in the war. He was shot by a German sniper in March 1916 and died in hospital on April 4.

Legacy
After his death a portrait of Moore was commissioned by Premier Arthur Lewis Sifton and was displayed in the legislature for many years.

His wartime letters home have been published in Path of Duty, edited by Ken Tingley.

Bramley-Moore has become a hero to later Alberta separatists for his many quotations and writings on exploitation of Alberta by eastern Canada.

References

External links

 Lance Corporal Alwyn Bramley-Moore – Canadian Great War Project
Legislative Assembly of Alberta Members Listing
The Path of Duty : the wartime letters of Alwyn Bramley-Moore 1914-1916
Free Alberta.com Alywn Moore quotes
"Canada and Her Colonies; or, Home Rule for Alberta" by Alwyn Bramley-Moore, (.PDF file, 17MB), c/o ProjectAlberta.com

1878 births
1916 deaths
People from Bloomsbury
English emigrants to Canada
Military personnel from London
Alberta Liberal Party MLAs
Canadian military personnel killed in World War I
Canadian Expeditionary Force officers
Canadian Militia officers
Western Canadian separatists